Swanscombe Skull Site or Swanscombe Heritage Park is a  geological Site of Special Scientific Interest in Swanscombe in north-west Kent, England. It contains two Geological Conservation Review sites and a National Nature Reserve. The park lies in a former gravel quarry, Barnfield Pit.

  
The area was already known for the finds of numerous Palaeolithic-era handaxes—mostly Acheulean and Clactonian artifacts, some as much as 400,000 years old—when in 1935/1936 work at Barnfield Pit uncovered two fossilised skull fragments. These fragments came to be known as the remains of Swanscombe Man but were later found to have belonged to a young woman. The Swanscombe skull has been identified as early Neanderthal or pre-Neanderthal, dating to the Hoxnian Interglacial around 400,000 years ago.

The skull fragments were found in the lower middle terrace gravels at a depth of almost 8 metres. They were found by Alvan T. Marston, an amateur archaeologist who visited the pit between quarrying operations to search for flint tools. A third fragment from the same skull was found in 1955 by Bertram and John Wymer. Swanscombe is one of only two sites in Britain that have yielded Lower Paleolithic human fossils, the other being Boxgrove Quarry, West Sussex, where 500,000-year-old leg bones and teeth ("Boxgrove Man") have been found.

Further excavations, carried out between 1968 and 1972 by Dr John d'Arcy Waechter, uncovered more animal bone and flint tools and established the extent of the former shoreline on which the bones were found.

Most of the bone finds are now in the Natural History Museum in London, with the stone finds at the British Museum. The other key paleolithic sites in the UK are Happisburgh, Pakefield, Pontnewydd, Kents Cavern, Paviland and Gough's Cave.

See also
Genetic history of the British Isles
 List of human evolution fossils
 List of prehistoric structures in Great Britain
 Prehistoric Britain

References

External links

Borough of Dartford
Stone Age sites in Kent
Sites of Special Scientific Interest in Kent
National nature reserves in England
Paleoanthropological sites
Neanderthal sites
Homo heidelbergensis fossils
Geological Conservation Review sites